Junior Lloyd Opara (born 6 January 1984) is an English former footballer who played as a striker. He played for many clubs during his career. While Opara was at Peterborough he starred in a 'Sky One' documentary Big Ron Manager which was aired in 2006.

His older brother Kelechi was also a professional footballer.

Career
He began his career at Colchester United in 2001 and made his senior debut on 13 October 2001 against Blackpool. After being released by Colchester in 2002 he joined Cambridge United, who were interested in taking on the final year of his scholarship. He instead joined Stevenage Borough in January 2003. He has also played for Enfield, Braintree Town, Hornchurch, Cheshunt, and Swindon Town and many others. He left Swindon by mutual consent in September 2004 after failing to adapt to life outside London. After a trial at Chelsea, Opara was unhappy with life at Swindon, the 22-year-old was also a transfer target for League Two side Peterborough after training at London Road. "Chelsea want him to go there for a trial period, so we can't stand in his way," Posh manager Steve Bleasdale told his club's website. Opara, who has had previous spells with Colchester, Cambridge and Swindon, has scored 23 goals this season for Southern League side Cheshunt.

He signed for Peterborough United on loan in March 2006, and while Opara was at Peterborough he starred in a Sky One documentary 'Big Ron Manager'. In January 2007 he joined Burton Albion on a month's loan, after which time he returned to Peterborough, who cancelled his contract the following month by mutual consent. He joined, then rejoined Arlesey Town, after another brief spell at Cheshunt where he came on as a sub and picked up a winners medal in the final of the 2008 Herts Charity Cup. In 2008–09 season he appeared for Broxbourne Borough in the Premier Division of the Spartan South Midlands League.

After football

After retiring from football Opara became a teacher. In 2018 he was a deputy headteacher at the John Port School in Derbyshire
 but he has left the role.

References

External links
Profile at UpThePosh! The Peterborough United Database

1984 births
Living people
Footballers from Enfield, London
English footballers
Association football forwards
Colchester United F.C. players
Cambridge United F.C. players
Stevenage F.C. players
Enfield F.C. players
Braintree Town F.C. players
Hornchurch F.C. players
Grays Athletic F.C. players
Swindon Town F.C. players
St Albans City F.C. players
Bishop's Stortford F.C. players
Redbridge F.C. players
Chelmsford City F.C. players
Cheshunt F.C. players
Peterborough United F.C. players
Burton Albion F.C. players
Windsor & Eton F.C. players
Harlow Town F.C. players
Potters Bar Town F.C. players
Waltham Forest F.C. players
Arlesey Town F.C. players
Broxbourne Borough F.C. players
Haringey Borough F.C. players
English Football League players
Isthmian League players